Year 1054 (MLIV) was a common year starting on Saturday (link will display the full calendar) of the Julian calendar.

Events 
 By place 

 Byzantine Empire 
 Sultan Tughril leads a large Seljuk army out of Azerbaijan into Armenia, possibly to consolidate his frontier, while providing an incentive to his Turkoman allies in the form of plunder. Tughril divides his army into four columns, ordering three to veer off to the north to raid into central and northern Armenia, while he takes the fourth column towards Lake Van. The Seljuk Turks capture and sack the fortress city of Artchesh, after an 8-day siege.

 Europe 
 Battle of Mortemer: The Normans, led by Duke William (the Conqueror), defeat a French army (near Mortemer), as it is caught pillaging and plundering. King Henry I of France withdraws his main army from the Duchy of Normandy as a result. Guy I, Count of Ponthieu, is captured during the course of the battle.

 Scotland 
 July 27 – Siward, earl of Northumbria, invades Scotland, to support King Malcolm III against Macbeth, who has usurped the Scottish throne from Malcolm's father, Duncan I. Macbeth is defeated at Dunsinane.

 Africa 
 The Almoravids retake the trading center of Aoudaghost from the Ghana Empire. Repeated Almoravid incursions, aimed at seizing control of the trans-Saharan gold trade, disrupt Ghana's dominance of the trade routes.

 Asia 
 Lý Nhật Tôn, third king of the Lý Dynasty, begins to rule in Vietnam, and changes the country's official name to Đại Việt.

 By topic 

 Astronomy 
 July 4 (approx.) – SN 1054, a supernova, is first observed by the Chinese, Arabs and possibly Native Americans, near the star Zeta Tauri. For 23 days it remains bright enough to be seen in daylight. Its remnants form the Crab Nebula (NGC 1952).

 Religion 
 Spring – Pope Leo IX sends a legatine mission, under Cardinal Humbert of Silva Candida, to Constantinople, to negotiate with Patriarch Michael I Cerularius, in response to his actions concerning the church in Constantinople. 
 July 16 – Humbert of Silva Candida, representative of the newly deceased Leo IX, breaks the relations between Western and Eastern Churches, through the act of placing an invalidly-issued Papal Bull of excommunication during the celebration of the Divine Liturgy (See East-West Schism).

Births 
 September 2 – Sukjong, ruler of Goryeo (d. 1105)
 Al-Hariri of Basra, Abbasid poet and scholar (d. 1122)
 Bohemond I of Antioch, Italo-Norman nobleman (approximate date)
 George II (Giorgi), king of Georgia (approximate date)
 Judith of Lens, niece of William the Conqueror (or 1055)
 Judith of Swabia, queen consort of Hungary (d. 1105)
 Langri Tangpa, Tibetan Buddhist master (d. 1123)
 Ramon Berenguer II, Count of Barcelona (or 1053)
 Tong Guan, Chinese general and adviser (d. 1126)

Deaths 
 February 20 – Yaroslav the Wise, Kievan Rus' grand prince (b. c.978)
 March 8 – Azelin (Azellinus), bishop of Hildesheim
 April 19 – Pope Leo IX, German pontiff of the Catholic Church (b. 1002)
 July 19 – Bernold (Bernulf), bishop of Utrecht
 August 25 – Fujiwara no Michimasa, Japanese nobleman (b. 992)
 August 31 – Kunigunde of Altdorf, German noblewoman (b. c.1020)
 September 1 – Fortún Sánchez, Navarrese nobleman (b. c.992)
 September 15 – García Sánchez III, king of Pamplona (b. c.1012)
 September 24 – Hermann of Reichenau, German music theorist (b. 1013)
 Abu Sahl Zawzani, Persian statesman and chief secretary
 Atiśa, Tibetan Buddhist leader and master (b. c.980)
 Cacht ingen Ragnaill, queen consort of Munster
 Nuño Álvarez de Carazo, Castilian nobleman 
 Osbern Pentecost, Norman knight and nobleman
 Osgod Clapa (Osgot), Anglo-Saxon nobleman

References